Events from the first millennium BC in Ireland.

Events
465 BC - Destruction by fire of later structure at Emain Macha, according to radiocarbon dating.
450 BC - Pseudo-historical date for foundation of Emain Macha as capital of Ulaid kingdom, according to 12th century text of Leabhar Gabala.
392 BC-201 BC - Murder of Clonycavan Man, according to radiocarbon dating
362 BC-175 BC - Murder date of Old Croghan Man, according to radiocarbon dating
307 BC-Pseudo-historical date for foundation of Emain Macha as capital of Ulaid kingdom, according to 8th century Irish World Chronicle, Pseudo-historical date for destruction of Dind Rig and foundation of kingdom of Leinster, according to Leabhar Gabala; dated to 300 BC by Orthanach ua Caellama Cuirrig (d.840).
300 BC - Earliest La Tène influences reach Ireland through trade with, and possible migration from, the continent.
200 BC - Bronze and iron being used at a crannog at Rathtinaun, Lough Gara, Co. Sligo, sculptures being made in stone and wood, creation of the Turoe stone, Bullaun, Co. Galway.

References

Years
Years
Years in Ireland